Judge Snyder may refer to:

Christina A. Snyder (born 1947), judge of the United States District Court for the Central District of California
Daniel John Snyder Jr. (1916–1980), judge of the United States District Court for the Western District of Pennsylvania
Harry G. Snyder (born 1938), judge of the Wisconsin Court of Appeals
Leslie Crocker Snyder (born 1942), judge of the Criminal Court of the City of New York and later of the New York Court of Claims
Judge Roy Snyder, fictional judge on The Simpsons